Nico Benalcazar (born June 6, 2001) is an American soccer player who plays as a defender for New York City FC II in MLS Next Pro.

Playing career

Youth
After playing with New England youth side Beachside SC, Benalcazar joined the academy of MLS club New York City FC in their first year of operation, in 2015. He progressed through their age categories from Under-14 upwards, eventually captaining the U-19 team. Benalcazar was voted onto the United States Soccer Development Academy in its U-15/16 Eastern Conference Best XI for the 2016–2017 season.

While acting as captain in the 2017–2018 season, he was awarded NYCFC U-19s’ Academy Player of the Year recognition. This award was given following the NYCFC Development Academy National Championship over LA Galaxy's U-19 squad in July 2018. He played for their MLS professional side in a preseason friendly against FC Copenhagen before their 2019 season while in Abu Dhabi, UAE.

College 
Benalcazar committed to playing college soccer at Wake Forest University, in Winston-Salem, NC. He was rated as a 4 star recruit, and the No. 38 recruit in the nation by TopDrawerSoccer, including the No. 8 defender and No. 3 recruit from New York region.

On August 30, 2019, Benalcazar made his collegiate debut for Wake Forest University, playing 90 minutes in a 2–1 victory against UCF.

Benalcazar received the following awards during his second season at Wake Forest University, 2020 All-ACC Second-Team Selection, 2020 All-ACC Academic Team Selection and was named to the 2020-21 TopDrawerSoccer Best XI Second-Team Selection.

Benalcazar left Wake Forest University in 2022 to sign with New York City FC. He played 54 matches with 49 starts. Benalcazar was named as captain for his last two years at the university. During the 2021 season he earned 2021 All-ACC Academic Team Selection, Third-Team All-ACC and Third-Team All-South Region honors.

Professional 
Nico rejoined NYCFC on a fully professional contract as a Homegrown Player on January 19, 2022, appearing in their preseason game against lower division Mexican side Inter Playa del Carmen . He then was appointed as the first ever captain of the club's new development side, New York City FC II, competing in the brand new MLS Next Pro competition making his professional debut on March 27, 2022. Nico was on the bench for the first team, for the first time ever during NYCFC's opening match of the 2023 season.

International career 
Benalcazar was born in the United States and is of Ecuadorian descent. He has been selected as a youth international for the United States at various levels but has stated his desire to play for the Ecuadorian federation as well.

Career statistics
.

References 

2001 births
American soccer players
Association football defenders
Living people
New York City FC II players
New York City FC players
United States men's under-20 international soccer players
Wake Forest Demon Deacons men's soccer players
MLS Next Pro players
Homegrown Players (MLS)
American people of Ecuadorian descent
Sportspeople of Ecuadorian descent